"Tremelo Song" was a single released by English rock band the Charlatans in 1992. The song reached number 44 on the UK Singles Chart. The single version was remixed by Mike "Spike" Drake.

Track listings
All live tracks were recorded at the Manchester Apollo on 8 April 1992.

CD1
 "Tremelo Song" (alternate take) – 4:09 	
 "Happen to Die" – 4:58 	
 "Normality Swing" (demo) – 2:53

CD2 (The Charlatans Live)
 "Tremelo Song" – 4:41
 "Then" – 4:10
 "Chewing Gum Weekend" – 5:27

12-inch
 "Tremelo Song" (alternate take)
 "Happen to Die" (unedited version)
 "Then"
 "Chewing Gum Weekend"

References

The Charlatans (English band) songs
1992 singles
1992 songs
Beggars Banquet Records singles
Song recordings produced by Flood (producer)